Crag Lough is an inland lake at the southern edge of Northumberland National Park,
At this point Hadrian's Wall is at the top of a line of crags, the Whin Sill, with Crag Lough at the foot of the crags.

Etymology
The etymology of Crag Lough is linked to the Cumbric word , meaning 'lake' (c.f. Welsh , Scottish Gaelic ). The 'Crag' element is probably from a word equivalent to Welsh , 'cliff'.

See also
Broomlee Lough
Greenlee Lough
Halleypike Lough

References

External links

Lakes of Northumberland